The Indian Councils Act 1861 was an Act of the Parliament of the United Kingdom that transformed India's executive council to function as a cabinet run on the portfolio system. This cabinet had six "ordinary members", who each took charge of a separate department in Calcutta's government: home, revenue, military, law, finance, and (after 1874) public works. The military Commander-in-Chief sat in with the council as an extraordinary member. The Executive Council was enlarged by addition of fifth member. The Viceroy was allowed, under the provisions of the Act, to overrule the council on affairs if he deemed it necessary, as was the case in 1879, during the tenure of Lord Lytton.

The Viceroy was allowed to issue ordinances lasting six months if the Legislative Council is not in session in an emergency.

After the Indian Rebellion of 1857, Sir Syed Ahmed Khan advised the British Government to take Indian nationals into the administration of India. He argued in his pamphlet The Causes of the Indian Revolt that the failure of the British to admit Indians into the Legislative Council, prevented them from having any say in government policies that touched them directly and was the major cause behind the revolt.

The Secretary of State for India, Sir Charles Wood, believed that the Act was of immense importance: "the act is a great experiment. That everything is changing in India is obvious enough, and that the old autocratic government cannot stand unmodified is indisputable."

The 1861 Act restored the legislative powers of Bombay and Madras Presidencies taken away by the Charter Act of 1833.  The legislative council at Calcutta was given extensive authority to pass laws for British India as a whole, but the legislative councils at Bombay and Madras were given the power to make laws for the "Peace and good Government" for only their respective presidencies. The Governor General was given the power to create new provinces for legislative purposes and could appoint Lieutenant Governors for the provinces.

However, from India's point of view, the act did little to improve the influence of Indians in the legislative council. The role of council was limited to advice, and no financial discussion could take place.

See also
 Bengal Legislative Council
 Bombay Legislative Council
 Madras Legislative Council

 Indian Councils Act 1892

References
 Indian Polity, by M Laxmikanth

1861 in British law
United Kingdom Acts of Parliament 1861
Acts of the Parliament of the United Kingdom concerning India
1861 in India